John Marr or Johnny Marr may refer to:

John Marr (before 1410–after 1454), Scottish regional administrator (List of Provosts and Lord Provosts of Aberdeen)
John Quincy Marr (1825–1861), American military officer
John Edward Marr (1857–1933), English geologist and academic
John Ralston Marr, British Indologist and writer
John S. Marr (born 1940), American physician, epidemiologist, and author
Johnny Marr (born 1963), English musician

See also
John Marr and Other Sailors, collection of poems by Herman Melville
John Marre, American soccer player
Marr (disambiguation)